Year 1250 (MCCL) was a common year starting on Saturday (link will display the full calendar) of the Julian calendar.

Events

By place

World 
 The world population is estimated at between 400 and 416 million individuals.
 World climate transitions from the Medieval Warm Period to the Little Ice Age.
 Medieval music: The Notre Dame school of polyphony ends.

Europe 
 February 2 – King Eric XI (Eriksson) dies and is succeeded by the 10-year-old Valdemar I, who is the eldest son of Birger jarl. He is elected as ruler of Sweden, and becomes the first Swedish king of the House of Folkung.
 October 12 – A great storm shifts the mouth of the River Rother in England 12 miles (20 km) to the west; a battering series of strong storms significantly alters other coastal geography around Romney Marsh.
 December 13 – Emperor Frederick II dies, beginning the 23-year-long "Great Interregnum". Frederick is the last Holy Roman Emperor of the Hohenstaufen dynasty; after the interregnum, the empire passes to the Habsburgs.
 The Lombard League dissolves upon the death of its member states' nemesis, Frederick II, Holy Roman Emperor.
 King Afonso III (the Boulonnais) captures the Algarve from the Moors, thus completing the expulsion of the Moors from Portugal.
 Albertus Magnus isolates the element arsenic, as the 8th discovered metal. He also first uses the word "oriole" to describe a type of bird (most likely the golden oriole).
 The Rialto Bridge in Venice (in modern-day Italy) is converted from a pontoon bridge to a permanent, raised wooden structure.
 The Ponts Couverts fortified bridges of Strasbourg (in modern-day France) are completed.
 Vincent of Beauvais completes his proto-encyclopedic work Speculum Maius ("Greater mirror").
 The first of the Parlements of Ancien Régime France is established.
 Villard de Honnecourt draws the first known image of a sawmill.
 The first usage is made of the English word "cuckold", according to the Oxford English Dictionary.

Asia 
 July 9 – The Qaymariyya tribe engineers a coup d'état to hand over Damascus to An-Nasir Yusuf. The garrison in the citadel surrenders later to him.
 A kurultai is called by Batu Khan in Siberia as part of maneuverings which will elect Möngke Khan as khan of the Mongol Empire in 1251.
 Starting in this year and ending in 1275, the Muslim Shougeng Pu, likely a Persian or an Arab, serves as the Commissioner of Merchant Shipping for the Song dynasty Chinese seaport at Quanzhou, due to his effort in defeating pirates.

Africa 
 April 8 – Battle of Fariskur: Louis IX (the Saint) is captured by Baibars' Mamluk army while he is in Egypt conducting the Seventh Crusade; he later has to ransom himself.
 April 30 – King Louis IX (the Saint) is released by his Egyptian captors after paying a ransom of one million dinars and turning over the city of Damietta.
 May 2 – Al-Muazzam Turanshah, Ayyubid ruler of Egypt, is murdered, ending effective Ayyubid Dynasty rule in the country. He is briefly succeeded by his widow, Sultana Shajar al-Durr.
 July 21 – Aybak becomes ruler of Egypt, beginning the Bahri Dynasty of the Mamluk Sultanate. After 5 days he stands down and the 6-year-old Al-Ashraf Musa is nominally proclaimed sultan.
 The Welayta state is founded in modern-day Ethiopia.
 In Tunis, a popular rebellion against newly arrived, wealthy and influential Andalusian refugees breaks out, and is violently put down.

Oceania 
 Samoa frees itself from Tongan rule, which begins the Malietoa dynasty in Samoa (approximate date).

By topic

Markets 
 The Flemish town of Douai emits the first recorded redeemable annuities in medieval Europe, confirming a trend of consolidation of local public debt started in 1218, in Rheims.
 The Sienese bankers belonging to the firm known as the Gran Tavola, under the steering of the Bonsignori Brothers, become the main financiers of the Papacy.
</onlyinclude>

Births 
 April 8 – John Tristan, son of Louis IX (d. 1270)
 Adolf II of Waldeck, prince-bishop of Liège (d. 1302)
 Agnes of Baden, German noblewoman (d. 1295)
 Albert II of Saxony, German nobleman (d. 1298)
 Albert III, German nobleman and knight (d. 1300)
 Albertus de Chiavari, Italian Master General (d. 1300)
 Allamah al-Hilli, Persian Shia theologian (d. 1325)
 Asher ben Jehiel, German Jewish rabbi (d. 1327)
 Beatrice of Savoy, Swiss noblewoman (d. 1292)
 Bonconte I da Montefeltro, Italian general (d. 1289)
 Diether of Nassau, archbishop of Trier (d. 1307)
 Dmitry of Pereslavl, Kievan Grand Prince (d. 1294)
 Esclaramunda of Foix, queen of Majorca (d. 1315)
 Fra Dolcino, Italian priest and reformist (d. 1307)
 Grigorije II of Ras, Serbian monk-scribe (d. 1321)
 Guido Cavalcanti, Italian poet and writer (d. 1300)
 Jeanne de Montfort, Swiss noblewoman (d. 1300)
 John IV (Laskaris), emperor of Nicaea (d. 1305)
 Konrad II of Masovia, Polish nobleman (d. 1294)
 Margaret of Burgundy, queen of Sicily (d. 1308)
 Matteo I Visconti, Italian imperial vicar (d. 1322)
 Mordechai ben Hillel, German scholar (d. 1298)
 Nijō Tameyo, Japanese official and poet (d. 1338)
 Niklot I, German nobleman and knight (d. 1323)
 Rhys ap Maredudd, Welsh nobleman (d. 1292)
 Robert II, French nobleman and knight (d. 1302)
 Sancho of Aragon, Spanish archbishop (d. 1275)
 Theodoric of Freiberg, German physicist (d. 1311)
 Zavis of Falkenstein, German nobleman (d. 1290)

Deaths 
 February 2 – Eric XI (Eriksson), king of Sweden (b. 1216)
 February 6 – Geoffrey VI, French nobleman and knight
 February 8
 Andrew III, French nobleman and knight (b. 1200)
 Fakhr ad-Din, Egyptian ruler and military leader
 Robert I (the Good), French nobleman (b. 1216)
 William Longespée (the Younger), English knight
 February 11 – Jean de Ronay, French Grand Master
 March 29 – Ludolph of Ratzeburg, German bishop
 April 6 
 Guillaume de Sonnac, French Grand Master
 Hugh XI of Lusignan, French nobleman (b. 1221)
 May 2 – Al-Muazzam Turanshah, Ayyubid ruler of Egypt
 May 21 – Humbert V, French nobleman and knight (b. 1198)
 May 26 – Peter I (Mauclerc), French nobleman (b. 1187)
 May 27 – Raniero Capocci, Italian priest and cardinal 
 June 7 – Vitslav I, Danish nobleman and knight (b. 1180)
 June 18 – Theresa of Portugal, queen of León (b. 1176)
 August 10 – Eric IV (Ploughpenny), king of Denmark
 October 4 – Herman VI, German nobleman and knight
 October 12 – Richard Wendene, English bishop (b. 1219)
 December 13 – Frederick II, Holy Roman Emperor (b. 1194)
 Alice of Schaerbeek, Flemish Cistercian lay sister (b. 1220)
 Gilbertus Anglicus, English physician and writer (b. 1180)
 Julian of Speyer, German Franciscan composer and poet
 Leonardo of Pisa, Italian mathematician and writer (b. 1170)
 Romée de Villeneuve, French nobleman and seneschal
 Shihab al-Din Muhammad al-Nasawi, Persian biographer
 Walter of Serviliano, Italian Benedictine hermit and abbot
 Yang Miaozhen, Chinese female military leader (b. 1193)

References